Galin Ivanov is the name of:

 Galin Ivanov (footballer born 1975) (born 1975), Bulgarian footballer and now manager
 Galin Ivanov (footballer, born 1988) (born 1988), Bulgarian footballer